The 1982 Maine Black Bears football team represented the University of Maine as a member of the Yankee Conference during the 1982 NCAA Division I-AA football season. Led by second-year head coach Ron Rogerson, the Black Bears compiled an overall record of 7–4 and a conference mark of 3–2, sharing the Yankee Conference title with Boston University, Connecticut, and UMass.

Schedule

References

Maine
Maine Black Bears football seasons
Yankee Conference football champion seasons
Maine Black Bears football